Pixel Revolt is an album by American singer-songwriter John Vanderslice.  It was released on August 23, 2005.  In addition to the normal track listing, a track titled "The Kingdom" can be found on the Japanese and vinyl versions of the record. According to Vanderslice, the piece thematically belongs on the record but "bogs it down", and was left off the American CD release.

Track listing
"Letter to the East Coast"
"Plymouth Rock"
"Exodus Damage"
"Peacocks in the Video Rain"
"Trance Manual"
"New Zealand Pines"
"Radiant with Terror"
"Continuation"
"Dear Sarah Shu"
"Farewell Transmission"
"Angela"
"Dead Slate Pacific"
"The Golden Gate"
"CRC 7173, Affectionately"
"The Kingdom" (Japanese and vinyl release only)

2005 albums
John Vanderslice albums
Barsuk Records albums
Albums produced by Scott Solter